Outworld is the debut album by the American progressive metal band Outworld. It was released on November 13, 2006 by Replica Records. The Japanese version of the album includes a bonus track entitled, "Polar".

Track listing

Videography
The song, "Warcry" was made as a video and can be viewed on their official website. The Video Features Carlos Zema as lead singer. The band is shown playing a jam session and an audience starts moshing as Rusty Cooley goes into a shredding solo. Near the end of the video Carlos Zema utilizes "growling vocals". The video was directed by Stacy Davidson.

Credits

Band members
 Rusty Cooley − Guitar
 Shawn Kascak − Bass
 Bobby Williamson − Keyboard
 Matt McKenna − Drums
 Kelly Sundown Carpenter - Vocals (Studio)
 Carlos Zema − Vocals ("War Cry" video version)

Production
 Recorded at: Spyder Studios, Texas, USA
 Mixed at: Spyder Studios, Texas, USA
 Mastered at: Jailhouse Studios, Denmark
 Produced by: Outworld
 Mixed by: Outworld
 Mastered by: Tommy Hansen
 Artwork by: Mattias Norén
 Layout by: Claus Jensen

References

Outworld albums
2006 debut albums